The IMAM Ro.44 was a fighter seaplane developed in Italy, a single seater derivative of the Ro.43 that first flew in October 1936. While the Ro.43 had serious problems, the Ro.44 was an utter failure. Armed with two 12.7 mm machine guns fitted in the nose, the rear fuselage of the R.43 was redesigned to dispense with the observer's position, and changes were made to the tail. Overall, performance remained almost identical to that of the Ro.43, although the Ro.44 was more maneuverable.

Although it was fast enough to intercept machines like the Fairey Swordfish and Fairey Seafox, its actual performance (and sea-keeping capabilities) was so poor, that out of 51 ordered, only 35 were produced. They were used only in the Aegean Sea, with 161 Squadriglia having seven examples in service at the beginning of World War II but was soon retired from the front line and sent to seaplane schools. This was the last OFM/IMAM biplane to be designed.

Operators

Regia Aeronautica

Specifications

See also

References

 
 
 

Ro.44
World War II Italian fighter aircraft
1930s Italian fighter aircraft
Floatplanes
Biplanes
Single-engined tractor aircraft
Aircraft first flown in 1936